Solomon Freelon, Jr. (born February 19, 1951) is an American retired gridiron football player who played in the CFL and NFL for the Edmonton Eskimos and Houston Oilers. He won the Grey Cup with Edmonton in 1975. He played college football at Grambling State University.

References

1951 births
Living people
Sportspeople from Monroe, Louisiana
Players of American football from Louisiana
Houston Oilers players
Edmonton Elks players